Bourgeois is the adjectival form of the French bourgeoisie, a loosely defined designated group characterized by private wealth, an upper class social status, and its related culture.
Bourgeois may also refer to:
 Bourgeois (surname)
 bourgeois (typography), the name of the type size between brevier and long primer
 H. L. Bourgeois High School, Gray, Louisiana, United States
Bourgeois is a synonym for these wine grapes:
Elbling, in the Mosel region
Gouais blanc, historic white grape
 Bourgeois fish, a common name for Lutjanus sebae, a snapper from the Indo-West Pacific
 Les Bourgeois, a song (and album) by Jacques Brel

See also 
 
 
 Bourgeoys (disambiguation)